Sleep on It may refer to:

Sleep on It (TV series)
"Sleep on It" (song)
Sleep On It (band)